Richard D. Phillips is an American economist, currently the C. V. Starr Professor of Risk Management and Insurance at J. Mack Robinson College of Business, Georgia State University.

References

Year of birth missing (living people)
Living people
Georgia State University faculty
American economists
Place of birth missing (living people)